Silver(I,III) oxide or tetrasilver tetroxide is the inorganic compound with the formula Ag4O4. It is a component of silver zinc batteries. It can be prepared by the slow addition of a silver(I) salt to a persulfate solution e.g. AgNO3 to a Na2S2O8 solution.  It adopts an unusual structure, being a mixed-valence compound.  It is a dark brown solid that decomposes with evolution of O2 in water.  It dissolves in concentrated nitric acid to give brown solutions containing the Ag2+ ion.

Structure
Although its empirical formula, AgO, suggests that the compound tetrasilver tetraoxide has silver in the +2 oxidation state, each unit has two monovalent silver atoms bonded to an oxygen atom, and two trivalent silver atoms bonded to three oxygen atoms, and it is in fact diamagnetic. X-ray diffraction studies show that the silver atoms adopt two different coordination environments, one having two collinear oxide neighbours and the other four coplanar oxide neighbours. tetrasilver tetraoxide is therefore formulated as AgIAgIIIO2 or Ag2O·Ag2O3. It has previously been called silver peroxide, which is incorrect since it does not contain the peroxide ion, O22−.

Uses

Tetrasilver tetroxide has been marketed under a trade name "Tetrasil."  In 2010 The FDA issued a warning letter to an American company concerning the firm's marketing of Tetrasil and Genisil ointments of tetrasilver tetroxide for herpes and similar conditions.

References

Silver compounds
Mixed valence compounds
Transition metal oxides